Jakob Ploompuu (11 October 1872, Koitjärve (now Kuusalu Parish), Kreis Harrien – 13 September 1948, Koitjärve) was an Estonian journalist, publisher and politician. He was a member of Estonian Constituent Assembly. He was a member of the assembly since 12 March 1920. He replaced Karl Kirp. Jakob Ploompuu was the younger brother of Johann Ploompuu.

References

1872 births
1948 deaths
People from Kuusalu Parish
People from Kreis Harrien
Estonian People's Party politicians
Members of the Estonian Constituent Assembly
Estonian journalists
Estonian publishers (people)
University of Helsinki alumni